Sorum is a 2001 South Korean horror film. Sorum or Sørum may also refer to
Sørum, a municipality in Norway
Sorum, South Dakota, an unincorporated community in the United States
Matt Sorum (born 1960), American drummer and percussionist

See also
Sørum (surname)